The Janghang Line is a railway line serving South Chungcheong Province in South Korea.  The line connects Cheonan (on the Gyeongbu Line) to the railway junction city of Iksan. The Janghang Line is served by frequent Saemaeul-ho and Mugunghwa-ho passenger train services between Seoul and Iksan. There is also a link from Asan station to the KTX network at Cheonan-Asan station.

History

The original Janghang Line was opened along its full length between Cheonan and Janghang by the Chosen Gyeongnam Railway on June 1, 1922.

Upgrade

The entire Janghang Line is being electrified and double-tracked and upgraded for higher speeds with a straighter alignment. Work started in 1997 from Cheonan. By the end of 2008, the new alignment was in service from Cheonan via Asan and Hongseong to Sinseong, from Jupo to Nampo, and from Ganchi to Janghang, and electrification was put in service on the first 19.4 km between Cheonan and Sinchang, after Asan, on December 15, 2008.  The 17.1 km section near Janghang, opened in December 2007, also linked up the Janghang Line with the previously isolated Iksan-Gunsan line via a new bridge over the Geum River, with alignment built for two tracks but initially a single track laid. Currently the Sinseong-Jupo, Nampo-Ganchi and Janghang-Gunsan sections are in construction. The entire line is slated to be finished in 2018.

The Janghang Line will link up with Seohae Line at Hongseong station. It will connect Hongseong to Hwaseong in Gyeonggi-do. It will be connected to southern extension of the Sosa–Wonsi Line and Sinansan Line. Seohae Line will serve 250 km/h speed, which will dramatically reduce travel time between Seoul and Hongseong.

Services

Seoul Metropolitan Subway

Seoul Subway's Line 1 services run on the line between Cheonan–Sinchang stations.

stations

See also
Korail
Transportation in South Korea

References

 
Railway lines in South Korea
Railway lines opened in 1922
Transport in South Chungcheong Province
Transport in North Jeolla Province
Korail lines